Berau Regency is one of the seven regencies in East Kalimantan province in Indonesia. The capital is the town of Tanjung Redeb. It has an area of 36,962.37 km2 and had a population of 179,079 at the 2010 census and 248,035 at the 2020 census; the official estimate as at mid 2021 was 252,648.

Berau was formerly the name of a local sultanate that existed during the Dutch colonial period. In the early 19th century, it was divided into two separate sultanates: Gunung Tabur and Sambaliung.

Administrative Districts 
Berau Regency is divided into thirteen districts (kecamatan), tabulated below with their areas and their populations at the 2010 census and the 2020 census, together with the official estimates as at mid 2021. The table also includes the location of the district headquarters, the number of administrative villages (rural desa and urban kelurahan) and offshore islands in each district, and its postal codes.

Notes: (a) while the name of this district literally means "Derawan Island", in practice the district includes a dozen large islands, together with part of the 'mainland' of Kalimantan. (b) except the villages of Gunung Panjang (with a post code of 77311) and Bugis (with a post code of 77312. (c) except the villages of Rinding (with a post code of 77313) and Teluk Bayur and Tumbit Melayu (with a post code of 77315).

Berau Marine Conservation Area
Konservasi Kawasan Laut (KKL) Berau or Berau Marine Conservation Area is formed in 2005 has 1,321 million hectares area which lies among Pulau Panjang (Long Island), Karangtigau Cape, and Baliktaba Reef. The area has the second highest coral reef biodiversity in Indonesia after Raja Ampat Islands and third highest in the world. The ecosystem covers coral reef, mangrove forest and sea grass.

Literary significance
The novelist Joseph Conrad made four visits to Berau, stopping at Tanjung Redeb, while employed as the first mate of the merchant vessel S.S. Vidar in 1887–1888. The geographical setting and the lives of the small number of European traders based in Berau made a profound impression on him, and the setting for three of his novels (Almayer's Folly, An Outcast of the Islands and the second part of Lord Jim) is loosely based on Berau. Conrad sometimes refers to the Berau river as Pantai and uses the fictional name Sambir to refer to Tanjung Redeb.

References

External links
   
  Site about forest conservation in Berau
  Berau, Supermarket Wisata Kalimantan Timur